Dorsey Lee "Dixie" Carroll (May 19, 1891October 13, 1984) is a former Major League Baseball outfielder who played for the Boston Braves for sixteen days in 1919.

References 

1891 births
1984 deaths
Major League Baseball outfielders
Baseball players from Kentucky
Atlanta Braves players
Sportspeople from Paducah, Kentucky